Thysanodonta opima is a species of sea snail, a marine gastropod mollusk in the family Calliostomatidae.

Description
The length of the shell attains 9.1 mm.

Distribution
This marine species occurs off New Caledonia at depths between 775 m and 965 m.

References

 Marshall, B.A. (1995). Calliostomatidae (Gastropoda: Trochoidea) from New Caledonia, the Loyalty Islands and the northern Lord Howe Rise. pp. 381–458 in Bouchet, P. (ed.). Résultants des Campagnes MUSORSTOM, Vol. 14 . Mém. Mus. nat. Hist. nat. 167 : 381–458

External links

opima
Gastropods described in 1995